The 1983–84 Irish League season was the 110th season for the top division of football in Northern Ireland. 14 teams contested the division, an increase of two on the previous season, with Carrick Rangers and Newry Town becoming the first new participants in the league since the 1972–73 season. The league title was won by Linfield for the third consecutive time.

League standings

Results

References
Northern Ireland - List of final tables (RSSSF)

NIFL Premiership seasons
1983–84 in Northern Ireland association football
North